Jens Christian Mosegaard Madsen (born 20 April 1972) is a Danish former professional footballer who played as a defender. He competed in the men's tournament at the 1992 Summer Olympics.

References

External links
 

1972 births
Living people
People from Herning Municipality
Association football defenders
Danish men's footballers
Holstebro BK players
Ikast FS players
Odense Boldklub players
Vejle Boldklub players
Aarhus Gymnastikforening players
Denmark international footballers
Olympic footballers of Denmark
Footballers at the 1992 Summer Olympics
Sportspeople from the Central Denmark Region